Sand! is a 1920 American silent Western film directed by Lambert Hillyer and written by Lambert Hillyer based upon the Russell A. Boggs short story "Dan Kurrie’s Inning." The film stars William S. Hart, Mary Thurman, G. Raymond Nye, Patricia Palmer, Bill Patton, and S.J. Bingham. It was released on June 20, 1920, by Paramount Pictures.

Cast 
 William S. Hart as Dan Kurrie
 Mary Thurman as Margaret Young
 G. Raymond Nye as Joseph Garber
 Patricia Palmer as Josie Kirkwood
 Bill Patton as Pete Beckett
 S. J. Bingham as Superintendent Trap

Survival status
Copies of the film are in the Library of Congress and George Eastman House Motion Picture Collection.

Reception 
The film received a positive review in The Film Daily, stating that it as a whole was a "Virile western subject that has some very pleasing bits; will sure to please Bill Hart fans".

Burns Mantle, writing for Photoplay Magazine, gave it a mixed review, stating that "A better Western than 'Human Stuff' is William S. Hart's 'Sand,' but this, too, is below the Hart standard - the standard, at least, established by 'The Toll-Gate.'"

Moving Picture World reported that president Woodrow Wilson had seen the film and had enjoyed it.

References

External links 

 

1920 films
1920 Western (genre) films
Paramount Pictures films
Films directed by Lambert Hillyer
American black-and-white films
Silent American Western (genre) films
1920s English-language films
1920s American films